This is a list of awards and nominations for Brazilian filmmaker and producer Walter Salles.

Academy Awards

Argentine Film Critics Association

BAFTA Awards

Bangkok International Film Festival

Berlin International Film Festival

Cannes Film Festival

César Award

Cinema Brazil Grand Prize

David di Donatello

Golden Globe Awards

Havana Film Festival

Independent Spirit Awards

National Board of Review Awards

Online Film Critics Society Awards

Satellite Awards

São Paulo Association of Art Critics

Sydney Film Festival

Venice International Film Festival

References

Salles, Walter
Brazilian filmmakers